West Cumberland was a county constituency in the House of Commons of the Parliament of the United Kingdom. It elected two Members of Parliament (MPs) by the bloc vote system of election.

Boundaries 
1832–1885: The Wards of Allerdale above Derwent and Allerdale below Derwent.

In 1832 the historic county of Cumberland, in north west England, was split for parliamentary purposes into two county divisions. These were the East Cumberland division (with a place of election at Carlisle) and the West division (where voting took place at Cockermouth). Each division returned two members to Parliament.

The parliamentary boroughs included in the West division, between 1832 and 1885, (whose non-resident 40 shilling freeholders voted in the county constituency) were Cockermouth and Whitehaven. (Source: Stooks Smith).

History 
For most of its existence this was an extremely Conservative division, in sharp contrast to the mostly Liberal inclined East division of the county. Only once, in the last election in 1880, was a Liberal MP elected.

The county began to industrialise from the 1860s. An Irish community developed in the west of Cumberland particularly at Cleator Moor, attracted by the opportunity to find work in the areas developing iron industry. It may be that these economic and demographic developments made the Liberals, critical of the remnant Anglican ascendancy, more competitive by 1880 than they had been earlier in the century.

In 1885 this division was abolished. The East and West Cumberland county divisions were replaced by four new single-member county constituencies. These were Cockermouth, Egremont (the Western division), Eskdale (Northern division) and Penrith (Mid division). In addition there were two  remaining Cumberland borough constituencies; Carlisle and Whitehaven.

Members of Parliament 

Note:-
 a Muncaster was a Peer of Ireland until 1898 and therefore eligible to serve in the House of Commons.

Election results

Elections in the 1830s

 
 
 

Elections in the 1840s

Elections  in the 1850s

Elections in the 1860s
Wyndham's death caused a by-election.

Elections in the 1870s
Lowther succeeded to the peerage, becoming Earl of Lonsdale and causing a by-election.

Elections in the 1880s

See also 
List of former United Kingdom Parliament constituencies

References

Sources 
 Boundaries of Parliamentary Constituencies 1885-1972, compiled and edited by F.W.S. Craig (Parliamentary Reference Publications 1972)
 British Parliamentary Election Results 1832-1885, compiled and edited by F.W.S. Craig (Macmillan Press 1977)
 The Parliaments of England by Henry Stooks Smith (1st edition published in three volumes 1844–50), second edition edited (in one volume) by F.W.S. Craig (Political Reference Publications 1973)
 Social Geography of British Elections 1885-1910. by Henry Pelling (Macmillan 1967)
 Who's Who of British Members of Parliament: Volume I 1832-1885, edited by M. Stenton (The Harvester Press 1976)
 Who's Who of British Members of Parliament, Volume II 1886-1918, edited by M. Stenton and S. Lees (Harvester Press 1978)

Cumberland
Parliamentary constituencies in North West England (historic)
Constituencies of the Parliament of the United Kingdom established in 1832
Constituencies of the Parliament of the United Kingdom disestablished in 1885